Gideon is a character in the Hebrew Bible.

Gideon may also refer to:

 Gideon (name) is a male given name and surname of Hebrew origin

Religion 
Gideon (Book of Mormon), a figure in the Book of Mormon
Gideons International, distributor of copies of the Bible

Arts, entertainment, and media

Film and television
Gideon (Charmed), a character in the television show Charmed
Gideon (film), a 1998 film starring Christopher Lambert
Gideon (The Flash), an artificial intelligence from the television series The Flash
Gideon (Legends of Tomorrow), an artificial intelligence from the television series Legends of Tomorrow
Gideon (play), a 1961 Broadway drama by Paddy Chayefsky
Gideon (TV series), an early 1980s children's TV cartoon series
"Gideon: Tuba Warrior", a VeggieTales episode
George Gideon of Scotland Yard, a fictional detective in novels, film and television created by John Creasey
Jason Gideon, a character in the television show Criminal Minds
Moff Gideon, an antagonist in the Star Wars television series The Mandalorian
Gideon, Belle and Rumplestiltskin's son in the TV series Once Upon a Time
Gideon Gleeful, a character from the television series Gravity Falls
Gideon Nav, a protagonist in the The Locked Tomb series of novels. Cavalier primary to the Reverend Daughter of Drearburh. Gideon the Ninth

Music
Gideon (album), a 1980 album by Kenny Rogers
Gideon (band), an American hardcore band
Gideon (Handel), a 1769 oratorio pastiche
"Gideon", a song by My Morning Jacket from Z

Other arts, entertainment, and media
Gideon (comics), a Marvel Comics supervillain
Gideon Fell, a fictional detective in novels created by John Dickson Carr
Sam Gideon, the main character in the video game Vanquish
Gideon Jura, a Planeswalker in the trading card game Magic: The Gathering

Military
Gideon Force, Ethiopian regular force during World War II
Operation Gideon, a 1948 Haganah military operation to capture Beisan
El Junquito raid (2018), codenamed Operation Gideon, Venezuela
Operation Gideon (2020), Venezuela

Places 
Gideon, Missouri, U.S.
Gideon, Oklahoma, U.S.
Kfar Gideon northern Israel

Other 
Gideon Graves, the big bad of Scott Pilgrim
Gideon McDuck, a Disney character
Gideon v. Wainwright, a major American court battle which required state courts to provide indigent defendants with legal counsel at taxpayer expense
Global Infectious Disease Epidemiology Network (GIDEON), a medical decision support tool
 a character in the Disney 1940 animated film Pinocchio
 the Rastafarian term for Armageddon

People with the given name 
Gideon Ariel (born 1939), Israeli former Olympic competitor in the shot put and discus throw
Gideon Emery (born 1972), English actor, jazz musician, and voice actor
Gideon Gartner (born 1935), Israeli entrepreneur and philanthropist
Gideon Kliger (born 1980), Israeli Olympic sailor and world championship bronze medalist
Gideon Mantell (1790–1852), English geologist
George Osborne (born 1971), former British Chancellor of the Exchequer whose birth-name was Gideon
Gideon Raff (born 1972), Israeli film and television director, screenwriter, and writer
Gideon Okeke, Nigerian actor

People with the surname

Clarence Earl Gideon (1910–1972), prisoner who brought Gideon v. Wainwright to the Supreme Court
Elmo Gideon (1924–2010), American artist known for the Gideon Holocaust Collection
Louan Gideon (1955–2014), American actress
Ron Gideon (born 1964), American baseball coach
Wilhelm Gideon (1898–1977), German Nazi SS concentration camp commandant

See also
 Sword of Gideon, a 1986 Canadian television film
 The Mark of Gideon, Star Trek episode